The Middle Passage was a transoceanic segment of the Atlantic slave trade.

Middle Passage or The Middle Passage may also refer to:

 "Middle Passage" (poem), a 1945 poem by Robert Hayden
 Middle Passage (novel), a 1990 book by Charles Johnson
 The Middle Passage (book), a 1962 book by V. S. Naipaul
 The Middle Passage (film), a 1999 docudrama
 The Middle Passage (TV series), an upcoming comedy on IFC
 The Middle Passage (album), by Immortal Technique